The Warne was a British 4-wheeled cyclecar made from 1912 to 1915 by Pearsall Warne Ltd at the Icknield Works in Letchworth, Hertfordshire.

The car had a lightweight two-seat open body with full weather equipment. The car was launched in 1912 fitted with a JAP, V twin air-cooled engine of 964 cc with an RAC horsepower rating of 8 hp. but by the 1913 Olympia show the company had swapped to using F.E. Baker Ltd Precision 50 degree V-twin engines of 964cc. One model had the air cooled version of the engine, and the other used the water-cooled version.

In the original car the drive was to the rear wheels by belts, but the water-cooled version for 1913 had a 3-speed with reverse gearbox, the air-cooled version retaining the belt system. The suspension used half elliptic leaf springs all round.

The engine size increased to 1070 cc in 1915. 

It originally cost £99. The 1914 models with Precision engines were £120 for the air-cooled version and £130 for the water-cooled version. The air-cooled version was given a conventional appearance by fitting a dummy radiator.

In mid 1913 six cars a week were being made.

See also
 List of car manufacturers of the United Kingdom

References 

Cyclecars
Defunct motor vehicle manufacturers of England
Companies based in North Hertfordshire District